Ameerika Suvi is a 2016 Estonian comedy road movie directed by Rain Rannu, starring Einar Kuusk, Kristo Viiding, Helena Risti, Jarmo Murumaa, and Wyatt Kelly. It is inspired by true events.

Cast
Einar Kuusk as Martin
Helena Pruuli as Anna
Kristo Viiding as Norris
Jarmo Murumaa as Alan
Wyatt Kelly as Tyler

References

External links
 

2016 films
Estonian comedy films